10,000 Shots is the fifth album by Scottish-Canadian celtic punk band The Real McKenzies, recorded and released in 2005.

Track listing

References

External links 
 realmckenzies.com

2005 albums
The Real McKenzies albums
Fat Wreck Chords albums